Pseudomonas salomonii is a Gram-negative bacterium that infects garlic (Allium sativum). The type strain is CFBP 2022.

References

External links
 Type strain of Pseudomonas salomonii at BacDive -  the Bacterial Diversity Metadatabase

Pseudomonadales
Bacterial plant pathogens and diseases
Root vegetable diseases
Bacteria described in 2002